Rainer Scharinger (born 4 March 1967) is a German former professional footballer who is now a football manager. He was most recently the manager of Sonnenhof Großaspach.

Managerial career
Scharinger was named manager of Karlsruher SC on 2 March 2011 as the successor of the sacked Uwe Rapolder Following a 5–1 defeat against Dynamo Dresden he was sacked on 31 October 2011.

References

Living people
1967 births
Footballers from Karlsruhe
German footballers
Association football midfielders
Bundesliga players
2. Bundesliga players
ASV Durlach players
Karlsruher SC players
Karlsruher SC II players
VfR Mannheim players
SSV Ulm 1846 players
Stuttgarter Kickers players
Bahlinger SC players
German football managers
Karlsruher SC managers
2. Bundesliga managers
3. Liga managers